MT-USA (Music Television — USA) was an Irish music television programme broadcast between February 1984 and 1987. Known for the slogan, "Music Television USA - Music never looked better", it was produced by Green Apple Productions, co-founded by the show's presenter Vincent Hanley. MT-USA was broadcast on RTÉ 2 on Sunday afternoons and during the 1984–85 series was repeated on Friday nights. Each edition ran for three hours. Each block of videos was followed by a segment filmed in New York City with Hanley introducing the videos, discussing American music and culture, and interviewing a celebrity. RTÉ described him as Europe's first VJ (video jockey). The videos were primarily American acts, many previously little-known in Ireland., but the show also featured English pop chart acts, as well as up and coming Irish acts such as U2, In Tua Nua & light a big fire. A double-CD and DVD compilation featuring acts from the show's heyday went on release on 16 November 2007.

References

1984 Irish television series debuts
1987 Irish television series endings
1980s in Irish music
Irish LGBT-related television shows
Irish music television shows
RTÉ original programming